Saara is the name of two municipalities in Thuringia, Germany:
 Saara, Greiz
 Saara, Altenburger Land

See also
 Saara (disambiguation)